Unearthed  may refer to:

Arts and media

Film and television 

 Unearthed (film), a 2006 horror film
 "Unearthed" (Fringe), a 2010 episode of the television series Fringe
 "Unearthed" (Prison Break episode), an episode of the television series Prison Break

Music 

 Unearthed (Johnny Cash album), a posthumous Johnny Cash album
 Unearthed (Crimson Thorn album), a 1997 album by unblack metal band Crimson Thorn
 Unearthed (Nic Jones album), 2001
 Unearthed (E.S. Posthumus album), an E.S. Posthumus album

Radio
 Unearthed, an emerging artists music initiative and radio station run by Australian radio network Triple J

Video games 

 Unearthed: Trail of Ibn Battuta, an action-adventure video game developed in Saudi Arabia

Organizations 

 Unearthed Films, a U.S. film distribution company
 Unearthed (publication), an investigations unit set up by Greenpeace UK in 2012

See also
 Inearthed, former name of Finnish melodic death metal band Children of Bodom
 Unearth, American metalcore band